Robert Michael Gibson (1938 – September 2010) was a British caricaturist, artist and illustrator who is best known for creating the illustrations & album art that appears in The Beatles' 1967 LP, "The Magical Mystery Tour" released on Parlophone Records. Inside the sleeve he also created a text comic based on the film Magical Mystery Tour. He also made graphic contributions to the Beatles monthly magazine The Beatles Book.

Along with George Dunning's animated film set to a Beatles' soundtrack, Yellow Submarine, the insert to The Magical Mystery Tour may be considered a classic artifact of psychedelic art, given its allegorical drug references, its bizarre illustrative style, the use of colourful 'bell-bottomed fonts', the "disconnected, " narrative etc.

He died in September 2010.

References

British illustrators
British caricaturists
British comics artists
Psychedelic artists
1938 births
2010 deaths
The Beatles